Alberto De Marchi (born 13 March 1986 in Jesolo, Italy) is a retired Italian rugby union player. His preferred position is Prop. He previously played for Benetton Treviso in the Pro12 competition. Before that he played for Aironi. He also represented Italy U21s with which he played the Under 21 Rugby World Championship and Italy A.

On 19 March 2014, De Marchi makes his move to the English Aviva Premiership to join Sale Sharks on a two-year contract. He played for the Italy national rugby union team that competed at the 2015 Rugby World Cup.

Honours
Coppa Italia
 Crociati Parma: 2007–08, 2008–09
Supercoppa d'Italia
 Crociati Parma: 2008

References

External links
Overmach Rugby Parma Profile

1986 births
Living people
Sportspeople from the Metropolitan City of Venice
Italian rugby union players
Italy international rugby union players
Benetton Rugby players
Aironi players
Sale Sharks players
Rugby union props
Italian expatriate rugby union players
Italian expatriate sportspeople in England
Expatriate rugby union players in England
People from Jesolo